Talemzane or madena (tamazight:ⵜⴰⵍⴻⵎⵣⴰⵏ Arabic:تالمزان/مادنة) is an impact crater in Algeria, 40 km south-east of Hassi Delaa (a small city).

One of four such craters in the country, Talemzane is classified as a simple crater. It has been designated by the 43rd Lunar and Planetary Science Conference to be a two-million- year-old, "true meteorite crater." 

Explored for the first time in 1928, studied in 1950 and 1988 by researchers from the universities of Oran (Algeria) and Nice (France). It is 1.75 km in diameter and the age is estimated to be less than three million years and is probably Pliocene.

The name Maadna come from Arabic for "depression of ore."

See also 

 List of impact craters in Africa

References

Further reading 
 Karpoff, R., A "meteorite" crater at Talemzane in southern Algeria, with discussion (in French). International Geological Congress, 19th, Algiers, pp. 233–241. 1954
 Karpoff, R., The meteorite crater of Talemzane in southern Algeria. Meteoritics, v. 1, pp. 31–38. 1953
 Koeberl, C., African meteorite impact craters: Characteristics and geological importance. Journal of African Sciences, v. 18, pp. 263–295. 1994
 Lambert, P., McHone, J.F. Jr., Dietz, R.S. and Houfani, M., Impact and impact-like structures in Algeria. Part I. Four bowl-shaped depressions. Meteoritics, v. 15, pp. 157–179. 1980
 Lambert, P., McHone, J.F. Jr., Dietz, R.S., Djender, M. and Briedj, M., Multi-ringed structures in Algeria: Ancient impact craters or not? (abstract). International Geological Congress, 26th, Paris, France, v. 3, pp. 1248. 1980
 McHone, J. F. Jr., Greeley, R., Talemzane: Algerian impact crater detected on SIR-A orbital imaging radar. Meteoritics, v. 22, pp. 253–264. 1987
 McHone, J. F. Jr., Lambert, P., Dietz, R.S. and Houfani, M., Bowl-shaped impact craters and circular depressions in Algeria (abstract). International Geological Congress, 26th, Paris, France, v. 3, p. 1250. 1980
 McHone, J. F. Jr., Lambert, P., Dietz, R.S. and Briedj, M., Impact structures in Algeria (abstract). Meteoritics, v. 15, pp. 331–332. 1980

Impact craters of Algeria
Neogene impact craters
Neogene Africa
Geography of Laghouat Province